Halyna Vasylivna Pundyk (born November 7, 1987) is a Ukrainian gold medallist in sabre fencing. She was a member of the team that won the gold medal in sabre at the 2008 Summer Olympics.

The Ukrainian women's team won gold in the sabre final, beating Russia during the 2009 and 2010 European Fencing Championships. At the 2009 World Fencing Championships Pundyk and her teammates beat France to win gold. The team won the title "Team of the Year" at the (Ukrainian) "Sports Heroes of the Year 2009" ceremony in April 2010.

Halyna's brother, Dmytro, is also a high-performance fencer.

References

External links
 Profile  at the European Fencing Confederation

1987 births
Living people
Armed Forces sports society (Ukraine) athletes
Ukrainian female sabre fencers
Fencers at the 2008 Summer Olympics
Olympic fencers of Ukraine
Olympic gold medalists for Ukraine
Olympic medalists in fencing
Medalists at the 2008 Summer Olympics
Ukrainian sabre fencers
Universiade medalists in fencing
Universiade silver medalists for Ukraine
Universiade bronze medalists for Ukraine
Medalists at the 2007 Summer Universiade
Medalists at the 2011 Summer Universiade
Medalists at the 2013 Summer Universiade
Sportspeople from Khmelnytskyi Oblast
20th-century Ukrainian women
21st-century Ukrainian women